Joseph Wong Wing-ping  GBS, JP (Hong Kong language: 王永平; born 25 July 1948) was the Secretary for Education Department, Secretary for Commerce, Industry and Technology and the Secretary for the Civil Service in Hong Kong.

Wong completed his secondary school education at Wah Yan College, Hong Kong, an eminent all-male Roman Catholic Jesuit school in Hong Kong.  He graduated from the University of Hong Kong in 1969. He also attended a one-year postgraduate course at the University of Oxford in 1974 and an eight-week Executive Program at Stanford University in 1989.

Wong is a career civil servant and was previously Hong Kong's permanent representative to the General Agreement on Tariffs and Trade (GATT) and the World Trade Organization (WTO).  He has also been a professor at the University of Hong Kong and the Chinese University of Hong Kong.

He continues to provide public commentary through opinion pieces in local media, such as South China Morning Post, Hong Kong Economic Journal and EJ Insight.

References

1948 births
Living people
Government officials of Hong Kong
Members of the Executive Council of Hong Kong
Alumni of the University of Hong Kong
Alumni of Wah Yan
Recipients of the Gold Bauhinia Star